"Yes Man" is an English language hit single by Norwegian singer Bjørn Johan Muri, written by Simone Larsen, Simen Eriksrud, and Muri himself. The song took part in the Norwegian contest Melodi Grand Prix 2010, held to select the Norwegian entry for the Eurovision Song Contest 2010, finishing fourth in the final on 6 February 2010. The eventual winner was Didrik Solli-Tangen with the song My Heart Is Yours.

Charts 
Amid its bid to represent Norway in Eurovision, the song proved to be commercially successful, staying at the top of Norwegian Singles Chart in February and March 2010.

References

2010 singles
Number-one singles in Norway
Melodi Grand Prix songs of 2010
2010 songs
Songs written by Simen Eriksrud
Songs written by Simone Eriksrud
Universal Music Group singles